The England national rugby sevens team competes in the World Rugby Sevens Series, Rugby World Cup Sevens and the Commonwealth Games. England's best finish in the Sevens Series is second place, which they have achieved four times, most recently in the 2016-17 season. They have once won the Rugby World Cup Sevens — the inaugural tournament in 1993.

The England Sevens team has generated several notable sevens players. Ben Gollings holds the record for points scored on the Sevens Series with 2,652 points. Dan Norton holds the record for tries scored on the Sevens Series with over 350 tries as of April 2020. England's Simon Amor (2004) and Ollie Phillips (2009) have each won a World Rugby Sevens Player of the Year award.

History

England won the 1973 International Seven-a-side Tournament, the first sevens tournament with national representative sides, defeating Ireland 22–18 in the final.

World Rugby Sevens Series
England is one of the more successful teams in the World Rugby Sevens Series. They have finished in the top three nine times — behind only New Zealand, Fiji, and South Africa.

Quadrennial tournaments

Rugby World Cup Sevens

Commonwealth Games

Rugby X Tournament

European competition
Europe Sevens Grand Prix Series

Note: In 2016, England did not enter a team in the Rugby Europe Grand Prix Sevens. Instead, Great Britain fielded a team.

World Series tournaments

England won the following legs of the World Rugby Sevens Series:
 Hong Kong Sevens (2002, 2003, 2004, 2006)
 Dubai Sevens  (2004, 2005, 2010, 2011)
 Australian Sevens (2003)
 South Africa Sevens (2003, 2016)
 USA Sevens (2006)
 Wellington Sevens (2009, 2013)
 Japan Sevens (2015)
 London Sevens (2003, 2004, 2009)
 Canada Sevens (2017)

Current squad

Player records
The following shows leading career England players based on performance in the World Rugby Sevens Series. Players in bold are still active.

See also
 Rugby Football Union
 England national rugby union team

References

External links
 

National rugby sevens teams
Rugby union in England
England national rugby union team